Kepler-421b is an exoplanet that, as of July 2014, has the longest known year of any transiting planet (704 days), although not as long as the planets that have been directly imaged, or many of the planets found by the radial-velocity method, or as long as some transiting planet candidates which are listed as planets in the Extrasolar Planets Encyclopaedia (KIC 5010054 b etc.). It is the first transiting-planet found near the snow-line.

Normally, at least three transits are required to confirm a planet. Due to very high signal to noise ratio, only two transits were sufficient to validate Kepler-421b to be a real planet without additional confirmation methods.

Kepler-421b is slightly larger than Uranus although its mass is not known.

References

Further reading

The Longest Year, Phil Plait, Slate, July 23, 2014
New Exoplanet Has the Longest Year Ever Discovered, July 23, 2014 at 2:15:00 PM by Niko Vercelletto, Popular Mechanics
Astronomers discover exoplanet with longest known year, Anthony Wood, July 23, 2014, Gizmag
First Exoplanet Discovered Beyond the “Snow Line”, by Shannon Hall on July 22, 2014, Universe Today
Transiting Exoplanet With Longest Known Year Discovered By Kepler Mission , July 22, 2014, RedOrbit
Discovery of a Transiting Planet Near the Snow-Line, David M. Kipping, Guillermo Torres, Lars A. Buchhave, Scott J. Kenyon, Christopher E. Henze, Howard Isaacson, Rea Kolbl, Geoff W. Marcy, Stephen T. Bryson, Keivan G. Stassun, Fabienne A. Bastien, (Submitted on 17 Jul 2014)

Exoplanets discovered in 2014
Transiting exoplanets
421b